Végh is a Hungarian surname. Notable people with the surname include:

Ágnes Végh (born 1939), Hungarian handball player
Attila Végh (canoeist), Hungarian sprint canoeist
Attila Végh (poet), Hungarian poet
Attila Végh (fighter), Slovak-Hungarian fighter
Sándor Végh (1912–1997), Hungarian violinist and conductor
Zoltán Végh (born 1971), Hungarian footballer

See also
Végh Quartet, Hungarian string quartet

Hungarian-language surnames